The Samsung Galaxy Tab S2 9.7 is an Android-based tablet computer produced and marketed by Samsung Electronics. Belonging to the high-end "S" line, it was announced on 20 July 2015 and was released in September 2015 along with the Samsung Galaxy Tab S2 8.0. It is available in Wi-Fi only and  Wi-Fi/4G LTE variants.

History 
The Galaxy Tab S2 9.7 was announced on 20 July 2015 from a Samsung press release.

The Android 7.0 update rollout began in April 2017.

Features
The device runs Android 5.1.1 Lollipop with Samsung's TouchWiz software suite.  An update to Android 6.0.1 Marshmallow was released in June 2016.  The Galaxy Tab S2 9.7 is available in Wi-Fi-only and 4G/LTE & Wi-Fi variants. Storage ranges from 32 GB to 64 GB depending on the model, with a microSDXC card slot for expansion up to 128 GB. It has a 3GB RAM capacity for decent computing. The display is a Super AMOLED (4:3) screen with a resolution of 2048x1536 pixels. It also features a 2.1 MP front-facing camera and an 8.0 MP AF rear-facing camera without LED flash. It also has the ability to record HD videos. The hardware home button serves as the fingerprint sensor.

The Galaxy Tab S2 9.7 takes design cues from the 2014 Galaxy Note 4 and 2015 Galaxy A series phones because the device has a painted metal frame with chamfered edges and a plastic back, along with a camera design similar to the Galaxy S6 It is available in black, white, or gold/beige colors. At 5.6mm thick, the Tab S2 9.7 is, as of September 2022, still one of the world's thinnest tablets together with the smaller screen Samsung Galaxy Tab S2 8.0.

See also
Comparison of tablet computers
Samsung Galaxy Tab series
Samsung Galaxy S series

References

External links
 

Samsung Galaxy Tab series
Android (operating system) devices
Tablet computers introduced in 2015
Tablet computers